The Secret of Life is the debut studio album by American singer-songwriter Gretchen Peters.  It was released in 1996, and featured a minor hit single in the track, "When You Are Old". The song reached number 68 on the Hot Country Songs chart. The album was the first release for Imprint Records.

Faith Hill covered the title track and took it to number 4 on the country chart in the States (while also scraping into the top 50 on the Billboard Hot 100). Trisha Yearwood recorded her own version of "On a Bus to St. Cloud" for her full-length Thinkin' About You (two years prior to the release of this album), while Martina McBride has recorded 3 songs: "This Uncivil War", "When You Are Old" and "Independence Day" which she took to number 12 on the U.S. country chart.

Reception

AllMusic gave the album three stars (out of a possible five), comparing her to fellow singer-songwriter Mary Chapin Carpenter, calling the songs "highly introspective, thoughtful and intelligent". An uncredited review in Billboard said that Peters "proves to be as satisfying a singer as she is a writer."

Track listing

Personnel
Gretchen Peters - vocals, acoustic guitar, Dobro
Chris Leuzinger, Michael Severs - guitars
Dan Dugmore - lap and pedal steel guitars
Bruce Bouton - pedal steel
Steve Conn - accordion
Daniel Green - keyboards, organ, percussion
Barry Walsh - keyboards, Hammond organ, piano, melodica
Phil Kenzie - soprano saxophone
Dave Pomeroy - electric and acoustic bass
Brian Barnett, Tommy Wells - drums, percussion
Nashville String Machine - strings; arranged and conducted by Connie Elisor
Steve Earle, Emmylou Harris, James House, Raul Malo, Harry Stinson, Billy Thomas - backing vocals and harmony

Production
Produced By Daniel Green
Engineered By Tom Hitchcock, Steve Marcantonio & Mike Psanos; assisted by Marc Frigo, Mike Purcell, Daryl Roudbush, Ed Simonton & John Thomas II
Mixed By Steve Marcantonio
Digital Editing By Don Cobb
Mastered By Denny Purcell

References

1996 debut albums
Gretchen Peters albums
Imprint Records albums